John Corynham (or Coringham) (d. 1444) was a Canon of Windsor from 1416 to 1444

Career

He was appointed:
Rector of Campsall 1405
Warden of the Free Chapel of St Mary, Jesmond, Newcastle upon Tyne
Warden of the Free Chapel of St Thomas the Martyr, Bedford bridge, (diocese of Lincoln) 1413 - 1416
Rector of Clewer, Berkshire
Registrar of the Order of the Garter
Treasurer 1426
Rector of St Michael-le-Querne, London 1435.

He was appointed to the third stall in St George's Chapel, Windsor Castle in 1416 and held the canonry until 1444.

Notes 

1444 deaths
Canons of Windsor
Year of birth unknown